C. robustus  may refer to:
 Callulops robustus, a frog species found in Indonesia and Papua New Guinea
 Campephilus robustus, the robust woodpecker, a bird species found in Argentina, Brazil and Paraguay
 Chaetodon robustus, the three-banded butterflyfish, a fish species endemic to Cape Verde
 Cisticola robustus, the stout cisticola, a bird species found in Africa

Synonyms
 Crocodylus robustus, a synonym for Voay robustus, an extinct crocodilian species found from Madagascar

See also
 Robustus (disambiguation)